Aleksandrovac is a city and municipality in Rasina District, Serbia.

Aleksandrovac may also refer to:

Aleksandrovac (Babušnica), a village in the Babušnica municipality of Šumadija District, Serbia
Aleksandrovac (Negotin), a village in the Negotin municipality of Bor District, Serbia
Aleksandrovac (Vranje), a village in the Vranje municipality of Pčinja District, Serbia
Aleksandrovac (Žabari), a village in the Žabari municipality of Braničevo District, Serbia